Mount Lorette is an ice-free mountain resembling a cathedral in form, rising to  close west of Mount Loodts in the Belgica Mountains of Antarctica. It was discovered by the Belgian Antarctic Expedition, 1957–58, under G. de Gerlache, who named it for Notre Dame de Lorette (Our Lady of Loreto), a patron saint of aviators.

References

Mountains of Queen Maud Land
Princess Ragnhild Coast